Classical Hollywood cinema is a term used in film criticism to describe both a narrative and visual style of filmmaking which first developed in the 1910s to 1920s, during the latter years of the silent film era. It then became characteristic of American cinema during the Golden Age of Hollywood, between roughly 1927 (with the advent of sound film) and 1969. It eventually became the most powerful and pervasive style of filmmaking worldwide.

Similar or associated terms include classical Hollywood narrative, the Golden Age of Hollywood, Old Hollywood, and classical continuity. The period is also referred to as the studio era, which may also include films of the late silent era.

History

1910s–1927: Silent era and emergence of the Classical style
For centuries, the only visual standard of narrative storytelling art was the theatre. Since the first narrative films in the mid-late 1890s, filmmakers have sought to capture the power of live theatre on the cinema screen. Most of these filmmakers started as directors on the late 19th-century stage, and likewise most film actors had roots in vaudeville (e.g. The Marx Brothers) or theatrical melodramas. Visually, early narrative films had adapted little from the stage, and their narratives had adapted very little from vaudeville and melodrama. Before the visual style which would become known as "classical continuity", scenes were filmed in full shot and used carefully choreographed staging to portray plot and character relationships. Editing technique was extremely limited, and mostly consisted of close-ups of writing on objects for their legibility.

Though lacking the reality inherent to the stage, film (unlike the stage) offers the freedom to manipulate apparent time and space, and thus create the illusion of realism – that is temporal linearity and spatial continuity. By the early 1910s, when the Lost Generation was coming of age, filmmaking was beginning to fulfill its artistic potential. In Sweden and Denmark, this period would later be known as the "Golden Age" of the film; in America, this artistic change is attributed to filmmakers like D. W. Griffith finally breaking the grip of the Edison Trust to make films independent of the manufacturing monopoly. Films worldwide began to noticeably adopt visual and narrative elements which would be found in classical Hollywood cinema. 1913 was a particularly fruitful year for the medium, as pioneering directors from several countries produced films such as The Mothering Heart (D. W. Griffith), Ingeborg Holm (Victor Sjöström), and L'enfant de Paris (Léonce Perret) that set new standards for the film as a form of storytelling. It was also the year when Yevgeni Bauer (the first true film artist, according to Georges Sadoul) started his short, but prolific, career.

In the world generally and America specifically, the influence of Griffith on filmmaking was unmatched. Equally influential were his actors in adapting their performances to the new medium. Lillian Gish, the star of The Mothering Heart, is particularly noted for her influence on on-screen performance techniques. Griffith's 1915 epic The Birth of a Nation was ground-breaking for film as a means of storytelling – a masterpiece of literary narrative with numerous innovative visual techniques. The film initiated so many advances in American cinema that it was rendered obsolete within a few years. Though 1913 was a global landmark for filmmaking, 1917 was primarily an American one; the era of "classical Hollywood cinema" is distinguished by a narrative and visual style which began to dominate the film medium in America by 1917.

1927–1969: Sound era and the Golden Age of Hollywood

The narrative and visual style of classical Hollywood style developed further after the transition to sound-film production. The primary changes in American filmmaking came from the film industry itself, with the height of the studio system. This mode of production, with its reigning star system promoted by several key studios, had preceded sound by several years. By mid-1920, most of the prominent American directors and actors, who had worked independently since the early 1910s, had to become a part of the new studio system to continue to work.

The beginning of the sound era itself is ambiguously defined. To some, it began with The Jazz Singer, which was released in 1927, when the Interbellum Generationers became of age and increased box-office profits for films as sound was introduced to feature films. To others, the era began in 1929, when the silent age had definitively ended. Most Hollywood pictures from the late 1920s to 1960s adhered closely to a genre — Western, slapstick comedy, musical, animated cartoon, and biopic (biographical picture) — and the same creative teams often worked on films made by the same studio. For instance, Cedric Gibbons and Herbert Stothart always worked on MGM films; Alfred Newman worked at 20th Century Fox for twenty years; Cecil B. DeMille's films were almost all made at Paramount Pictures; and director Henry King's films were mostly made for Twentieth Century Fox. Similarly, actors were mostly contract players. Film historians and critics note that it took about a decade for films to adapt to sound and return to the level of artistic quality of the silents, which they did in the late 1930s when the Greatest Generationers became of age.

Many great works of cinema that emerged from this period were of highly regimented filmmaking. One reason this was possible is that, as so many films were made, not every one had to be a big hit. A studio could gamble on a medium-budget feature with a good script and relatively unknown actors. This was the case with Citizen Kane (1941), directed by Orson Welles and regarded as one of the greatest films of all time. Other strong-willed directors, like Howard Hawks, Alfred Hitchcock and Frank Capra, battled the studios in order to achieve their artistic visions. The apogee of the studio system may have been the year 1939, which saw the release of such classics as The Wizard of Oz; Gone with the Wind; The Hunchback of Notre Dame; Stagecoach; Mr. Smith Goes to Washington; Destry Rides Again; Young Mr. Lincoln; Wuthering Heights; Only Angels Have Wings; Ninotchka; Beau Geste; Babes in Arms; Gunga Din; The Women; Goodbye, Mr. Chips; and The Roaring Twenties.

Style
The visual-narrative style of classical Hollywood cinema, as elaborated by David Bordwell, was heavily influenced by the ideas of the Renaissance and its resurgence of mankind as the focal point. It is distinguished at three general levels: devices, systems, and the relations of systems.

Devices
The devices most inherent to classical Hollywood cinema are those of continuity editing. This includes the 180-degree rule, one of the major visual-spatial elements of continuity editing. The 180-degree rule keeps with the "photographed play" style by creating an imaginary 180-degree axis between the viewer and the shot, allowing viewers to clearly orient themselves within the position and direction of action in a scene. According to the 30-degree rule, cuts in the angle that the scene is viewed from must be significant enough for the viewer to understand the purpose of a change in perspective. Cuts that do not adhere to the 30-degree rule, known as jump cuts, are disruptive to the illusion of temporal continuity between shots. The 180-degree and 30-degree rules are elementary guidelines in filmmaking that preceded the official start of the classical era by over a decade, as seen in the pioneering 1902 French film A Trip to the Moon. Cutting techniques in classical continuity editing serve to help establish or maintain continuity, as in the cross cut, which establishes the concurrence of action in different locations. Jump cuts are allowed in the form of the axial cut, which does not change the angle of shooting at all, but has the clear purpose of showing a perspective closer or farther from the subject, and therefore does not interfere with temporal continuity.

Systems

Narrative logic
Classical narration progresses always through psychological motivation, i.e., by the will of a human character and its struggle with obstacles towards a defined goal. This narrative element is commonly composed of a primary narrative (e.g. a romance) intertwined with a secondary narrative or narratives. This narrative is structured with an unmistakable beginning, middle and end, and generally there is a distinct resolution. Utilizing actors, events, causal effects, main points, and secondary points are basic characteristics of this type of narrative. The characters in classical Hollywood cinema have clearly definable traits, are active, and very goal oriented. They are causal agents motivated by psychological rather than social concerns. The narrative is a chain of cause and effect with causal agents – in classical style, events do not occur randomly.

Cinematic time and space
Time in classical Hollywood is continuous, linear, and uniform, since non-linearity calls attention to the illusory workings of the medium. The only permissible manipulation of time in this format is the flashback. It is mostly used to introduce a memory sequence of a character, e.g., Casablanca.

The greatest rule of classical continuity regarding space is object permanence: the viewer must believe that the scene exists outside the shot of the cinematic frame to maintain the picture's realism. The treatment of space in classical Hollywood strives to overcome or conceal the two-dimensionality of film ("invisible style") and is strongly centered upon the human body. The majority of shots in a classical film focus on gestures or facial expressions (medium-long and medium shots). André Bazin once compared classical film to a photographed play in that the events seem to exist objectively and that cameras only give us the best view of the whole play.

This treatment of space consists of four main aspects: centering, balancing, frontality, and depth. Persons or objects of significance are mostly in the center part of the picture frame and never out of focus. Balancing refers to the visual composition, i. e., characters are evenly distributed throughout the frame. The action is subtly addressed towards the spectator (frontality) and set, lighting (mostly three-point lighting, especially high-key lighting), and costumes are designed to separate foreground from the background (depth).

Relations of systems
The aspects of space and time are subordinated to the narrative element.

Legacy
The New Hollywood of the mid-1960s to early 1980s was influenced by the romanticism of the classical era, as was the French New Wave.

Major figures from Classic Hollywood cinema
Names in boldface type were recognized on the American Film Institute's list ranking the top 25 male and 25 female greatest screen legends of American film history. The top stars of their respective genders are Humphrey Bogart and Katharine Hepburn, who starred together in the classic adventure 1951 film The African Queen. As of 2023, Sophia Loren (88), is the only living star listed in the top 25 greatest screen legends. 

Carl Laemmle (1867–1939)
Marie Dressler (1868–1934)
Adolph Zukor (1873–1976)
D. W. Griffith (1875–1948)
Lionel Barrymore (1878–1954)
Max Factor (1877–1938)
Cecil B. DeMille (1881–1959)
Samuel Goldwyn (1882–1974)
John Barrymore (1882–1942)
Lon Chaney (1883–1930)
Douglas Fairbanks (1883–1939)
Louis B. Mayer (1884–1957)
Wallace Beery (1885–1949)
Sessue Hayakawa (1886–1973)
Chico Marx (1887–1961)
Harpo Marx (1888–1964)
Charlie Chaplin (1889–1977)
Victor Fleming (1889–1949)
Stan Laurel (1890–1965)
Groucho Marx (1890–1977)
Jack L. Warner (1892–1978)
Oliver Hardy (1892–1957) 
Ernst Lubitsch (1892–1947)
Mary Pickford (1892–1979)
William Powell (1892–1984)
Edward G. Robinson (1893–1973)
Harold Lloyd (1893–1971)
Mae West (1893–1980)
Jimmy Durante (1893–1980)
Lillian Gish (1893–1993)
Hattie McDaniel (1893–1952)
Gummo Marx (1893–1977)
Norma Talmadge (1894–1957)
John Ford (1894–1973)
King Vidor (1894–1982)
Rudolph Valentino (1895–1926)
Buster Keaton (1895–1966)
José Mojica (1895–1974)
Ruth Gordon (1896–1985)
Frank Capra (1897–1991)
Marion Davies (1897–1961)
Dorothy Arzner (1897–1979)
Edith Head (1897–1981)
Hal B. Wallis (1898–1986)
Randolph Scott (1898–1987)
Irene Dunne (1898–1990) 
Fred Astaire (1899–1987)
Gloria Swanson (1899–1983)
Irving Thalberg (1899–1936)
James Cagney (1899–1986)
Alfred Hitchcock (1899–1980)
Humphrey Bogart (1899–1957)
George Cukor (1899–1983)
Ramon Novarro (1899–1968)
Spencer Tracy (1900–1967)
Jean Arthur (1900–1991)
Helen Hayes (1900–1993)
Mervyn LeRoy (1900–1987)
Clark Gable (1901–1960)
Walt Disney (1901–1966)
Gary Cooper (1901–1961)
Marlene Dietrich (1901–1992)
Zeppo Marx (1901–1979)
David O. Selznick (1902–1965)
William Wyler (1902–1981)
Norma Shearer (1902–1983)
Bing Crosby (1903–1977)
Bob Hope (1903–2003)
Claudette Colbert (1903–1996)
Vincente Minnelli (1903–1986)
Cary Grant (1904–1986)
Dolores del Rio (1904–1983)
George Stevens (1904–1975)
Greer Garson (1904–1996)
Clara Bow (1905–1965)
Greta Garbo (1905–1990)
Henry Fonda (1905–1982)
Myrna Loy (1905–1993)
Joan Crawford (190?–1977)
Anna May Wong (1905–1961)
Gilbert Roland (1905–1994)
Louise Brooks (1906–1985)
Janet Gaynor (1906–1984)
Billy Wilder (1906–2002)
John Huston (1906–1987)
Fred Zinnemann (1907–1997)
Laurence Olivier (1907–1989)
Katharine Hepburn (1907–2003)
John Wayne (1907–1979)
Rosalind Russell (1907–1976)
Barbara Stanwyck (1907–1990)
Bette Davis (1908–1989)
Carole Lombard (1908–1942)
David Lean (1908–1991)
James Stewart (1908–1997)
Lupe Vélez (1908–1944)
Rex Harrison (1908–1990)
Douglas Fairbanks Jr. (1909–2000)
Errol Flynn (1909–1959)
Carmen Miranda (1909–1955)
Elia Kazan (1909–2003)
Joseph L. Mankiewicz (1909–1993)
David Niven (1910–1983)
Luise Rainer (1910–2014)
Vincent Price (1911–1993)
Jean Harlow (1911–1937)
Danny Kaye (1911–1987)
Ginger Rogers (1911–1995)
José Ferrer (1912–1992)
Gene Kelly (1912–1996)
Vivien Leigh (1913–1967)
Loretta Young (1913–2000)
Burt Lancaster (1913–1994)
Richard Widmark (1914–2008)
Dorothy Lamour (1914–1996)
Tyrone Power (1914–1958)
Hedy Lamarr (1914–2000)
Orson Welles (1915–1985)
Frank Sinatra (1915–1998)
Ingrid Bergman (1915–1982)
Alice Faye (1915–1998)
Anthony Quinn (1915–2001)
Olivia de Havilland (1916–2020)
Gregory Peck (1916–2003)
Betty Grable (1916–1973)
Van Johnson (1916–2008)
Kirk Douglas (1916–2020)
Jane Wyman (1917–2007)
Lena Horne (1917–2010)
Susan Hayward (1917–1975)
Robert Mitchum (1917–1997)
Joan Fontaine (1917–2013)
June Allyson (1917–2006)
William Holden (1918–1981)
Ida Lupino (1918–1995)
Rita Hayworth (1918–1987)
Jennifer Jones (1919–2009)
Maureen O'Hara (1920–2015)
Gene Tierney (1920–1991)
Michèle Morgan (1920–2016)
Mickey Rooney (1920–2014)
Montgomery Clift (1920–1966)
Ricardo Montalbán (1920–2009)
Shelley Winters (1920–2006)
Yul Brynner (1920–1985)
Deborah Kerr (1921–2007)
Jane Russell (1921–2011)
Esther Williams (1921–2013)
Cyd Charisse (1921–2008)
Lana Turner (1921–1995)
Mario Lanza (1921–1959)
Vera-Ellen (1921–1981)
Judy Garland (1922–1969)
Dorothy Dandridge (1922–1965)
Ava Gardner (1922–1990)
Doris Day (1922–2019)
Kathryn Grayson (1922–2010)
Charlton Heston (1923–2008)
Ann Miller (1923–2004)
Stanley Donen (1924–2019)
Marlon Brando (1924–2004)
Eva Marie Saint (1924–present)
Lauren Bacall (1924–2014)
Katy Jurado (1924–2002)
Jack Lemmon (1925–2001)
Richard Burton (1925–1984)
Paul Newman (1925–2008)
Rock Hudson (1925–1985)
Tony Curtis (1925–2010)
Angela Lansbury (1925–2022)
Dick Van Dyke (1925–present)
Marilyn Monroe (1926–1962)
Gina Lollobrigida (1927–2023)
Sidney Poitier (1927–2022)
Janet Leigh (1927–2004)
Shirley Temple (1928–2014)
James Garner (1928–2014)
Ann Blyth (1928–present)
Audrey Hepburn (1929–1993)
Jane Powell (1929–2021)
Grace Kelly (1929–1982)
Christopher Plummer (1929–2021)
Tippi Hedren (1930–present)
Joanne Woodward (1930–present)
Steve McQueen (1930–1980)
Mitzi Gaynor (1931–present)
James Dean (1931–1955)
Anne Bancroft (1931–2005)
Leslie Caron (1931–present)
Rita Moreno (1931–present)
Elizabeth Taylor (1932–2011)
Debbie Reynolds (1932–2016)
Anthony Perkins (1932–1992)
Peter O'Toole (1932–2013)
Omar Sharif (1932–2015)
Jayne Mansfield (1933–1967)
Kim Novak (1933–present)
Joan Collins (1933–present)
 Sophia Loren (1934–present)
Shirley MacLaine (1934–present)
Elvis Presley (1935–1977)
Julie Andrews (1935–present)
Diahann Carroll (1935–2019)
Albert Finney (1936–2019)
Jane Fonda (1937–present)
Margaret O'Brien (1937–present)
Natalie Wood (1938–1981)
Raquel Welch (1940–2023)

Living actors from the Classical Hollywood period
Those listed in bold were either awarded or nominated for a position on the American Film Institute's list ranking the top 25 male and 25 female greatest screen legends of American film history. With the death of Sidney Poitier in 2022, all male living legends and nominees have now died.  Besides Sophia Loren, there are 6 remaining female nominees: Ann Blyth (94), Claire Bloom (92), Mitzi Gaynor (91), Rita Moreno (91), Piper Laurie (91) and Margaret O'Brien (86). Recent deaths of nominees have included Poitier and Angela Lansbury in 2022, Gina Lollobrigida and Raquel Welch in early 2023.

See. AFI's 100 Years...100 Stars.

 Elisabeth Waldo – born 1918 (age )
 Caren Marsh Doll – born 1919 (age )
 Patricia Wright – born 1921 (age )
 Ray Anthony – born 1922 (age )
 Margia Dean – born 1922 (age )
 Micheline Presle – born 1922 (age )
 Janis Paige – born 1922 (age )
 Glynis Johns – born 1923 (age )
 Eva Marie Saint – born 1924 (age )
 Noreen Nash – born 1924 (age )
 Jacqueline White – born 1924 (age )
 Brigitte Auber – born 1925 (age )
 June Lockhart – born 1925 (age )
 Lee Grant – born 1925 (age )
 Dick Van Dyke – born 1925 (age )
 Roger Corman – born 1926 (age )
 Marilyn Knowlden – born 1926 (age )
 Terry Kilburn – born 1926 (age )
 Phyllis Coates – born 1927 (age )
 Lisa Lu – born 1927 (age )
 Harry Belafonte – born 1927 (age )
 Cora Sue Collins – born 1927 (age ) 
 Estelle Parsons – born 1927 (age )
 Peggy Dow – born 1928 (age )
 Nancy Olson – born 1928 (age )
 Ann Blyth – born 1928 (age )
 Earl Holliman – born 1928 (age )
 Garry Watson – born 1928 (age )
 Marion Ross – born 1928 (age )
 Terry Moore – born 1929 (age )
 James Hong – born 1929 (age )
 Don Murray – born 1929 (age )
 Vera Miles – born 1929 (age )
 Bob Newhart – born 1929 (age )
 Betta St. John – born 1929 (age )
 Tippi Hedren – born 1930 (age )
 Gene Hackman – born 1930 (age )
 Robert Wagner – born 1930 (age )
 Joanne Woodward – born 1930 (age )
 Clint Eastwood – born 1930 (age )
 Gena Rowlands – born 1930 (age )
 Mary Costa – born 1930 (age )
 Mamie Van Doren – born 1931 (age )
 James Earl Jones – born 1931 (age )
 Claire Bloom – born 1931 (age )
 Carroll Baker – born 1931 (age )
 Leslie Caron – born 1931 (age )
 Darryl Hickman – born 1931 (age )
 Barbara Eden – born 1931 (age )
 Mitzi Gaynor – born 1931 (age )
 Angie Dickinson – born 1931 (age )
 Rita Moreno – born 1931 (age )
 William Shatner – born 1931 (age )
Piper Laurie – born 1932 (age )
Ellen Burstyn – born 1932 (age )
 Felicia Farr – born 1932 (age )
 Kim Novak – born 1933 (age )
 Joan Collins – born 1933 (age )
 Carol Burnett – born 1933 (age )
 Julie Newmar – born 1933 (age )
 Debra Paget – born 1933 (age )
 Audrey Dalton – born 1934 (age )
 Shirley Jones – born 1934 (age )
 Shirley MacLaine – born 1934 (age )
 Pat Boone – born 1934 (age )
 Jean Marsh – born 1934 (age )
 Sophia Loren – born 1934 (age )
 Claude Jarman Jr. – born 1934 (age )
 Russ Tamblyn – born 1934 (age )
 Alain Delon – born 1935 (age )
 Julie Andrews – born 1935 (age )
 Robert Redford – born 1936 (age )
 Margaret O'Brien – born 1937 (age )
 Warren Beatty – born 1937 (age )
 George Takei – born 1937 (age )
 Jane Fonda – born 1937 (age )
 Diane Baker – born 1938 (age )
 Claudia Cardinale – born 1938 (age )
 Millie Perkins – born 1938 (age )
 Kathryn Beaumont – born 1938 (age )
 Connie Stevens – born 1938 (age )
 Dolores Hart – born 1938 (age )
 George Hamilton – born 1939 (age )
 Frankie Avalon – born 1940 (age )
 Ann-Margret – born 1941 (age )
 Fabian Forte – born 1943 (age )

List of selected notable films
The following is a chronological list of notable American films that were made during Hollywood's Golden Age.

Silent era

 The Mothering Heart (film short, 1913)
 The Birth of a Nation (1915)
 Intolerance (1916)
 Rebecca of Sunnybrook Farm (1917)
 The Immigrant (1917)
 The Poor Little Rich Girl (1917)
 Wild and Woolly (1917)
 Broken Blossoms (1919)
 Pollyanna (1920)
 The Last of the Mohicans (1920)
 Within Our Gates (1920)
 Way Down East (1920)
 Orphans of the Storm (1921)
 The Four Horsemen of the Apocalypse (1921)
 The Kid (1921)
 A Woman of Paris (1923)
 The Covered Wagon (1923)
 The Hunchback of Notre Dame (1923)
 Safety Last! (1923)
 Greed (1924)
 Sherlock Jr. (1924)
 The Thief of Bagdad (1924)
 Ben-Hur: A Tale of the Christ (1925)
 The Big Parade (1925)
 The Gold Rush (1925)
 Little Annie Rooney (1925)
 The Phantom of the Opera (1925)
 Flesh and the Devil (1926)
 Sparrows (1926)
 The Black Pirate (1926)
 The Canadian (1926)
 The General (1926)
 7th Heaven (1927)
 It (1927)
 The Unknown (1927)
 Wings (1927)
 The Circus (1928)
 The Wind (1928)
 City Lights (1931)
 Tabu (1931)
 Legong: Dance of the Virgins (1935)
 Modern Times (1936)

Sound era

 A Few Moments with Eddie Cantor (1923)
 My Old Kentucky Home (1926)
 The Jazz Singer (1927)
 Lights of New York (1928)
 Interference (1928)
 In Old Arizona (1928)
 Steamboat Willie (1928)
 The Broadway Melody (1929)
 On with the Show! (1929)
 A Free Soul (1930)
 All Quiet on the Western Front (1930)
 Anna Christie (1930)
 Morocco (1930)
 King of Jazz (1930)
 Romance (1930)
 The Divorcee (1930)
 Bad Girl (1931)
 Blonde Crazy (1931)
 Dracula (1931)
 Frankenstein (1931)
 Platinum Blonde (1931)
 The Public Enemy (1931)
 A Farewell to Arms (1932)
 Flowers and Trees (1932)
 Forbidden (1932)
 Freaks (1932)
 Grand Hotel (1932)
 Red Dust (1932)
 Scarface (1932)
 Shanghai Express (1932)
 The Animal Kingdom (1932)
 Trouble in Paradise (1932)
 She Done Him Wrong (1933)
 42nd Street (1933)
 Baby Face (1933)
 Design for Living (1933)
 Dinner at Eight (1933)
 Duck Soup (1933)
 Flying Down to Rio (1933)
 Footlight Parade (1933)
 The Invisible Man (1933)
 King Kong (1933)
 Lady for a Day (1933)
 Man's Castle (1933)
 Queen Christina (1933) 
 Snow-White (1933)
 Sons of the Desert (1933) 
 Broadway Bill (1934)
 Imitation of Life (1934)
 It Happened One Night (1934)
 Manhattan Melodrama (1934)
 No Greater Glory (1934)
 Of Human Bondage (1934)
 Poor Cinderella (1934)
 The Gay Divorcee (1934)
 The Old Fashioned Way (1934)
 The Thin Man (1934)
 Twentieth Century (1934)
 Woman Haters (1934)
 Wonder Bar (1934)
 Mutiny on the Bounty (1935)
 A Night at the Opera (1935)
 A Tale of Two Cities (1935)
 Anna Karenina (1935)
 The Band Concert (1935)
 Becky Sharp (1935)
 Gold Diggers of 1935 (1935)
 Sylvia Scarlett (1935)
 Top Hat (1935)
 Disorder in the Court (1936)
 Camille (1936)
 Follow the Fleet (1936)
 Libeled Lady (1936)
 Mr. Deeds Goes to Town (1936)
 My Man Godfrey (1936)
 Popeye the Sailor Meets Sindbad the Sailor (1936)
 San Francisco (1936)
 Swing Time (1936)
 Theodora Goes Wild (1936)
 The Awful Truth (1937)
 Captains Courageous (1937)
 Easy Living (1937)
 Gold Diggers of 1937 (1937)
 Heidi (1937)
 Lost Horizon (1937)
 Make Way for Tomorrow (1937)
 Marked Woman (1937)
 Nothing Sacred (1937)
 The Prisoner of Zenda (1937)
 Shall We Dance (1937)
 Snow White and the Seven Dwarfs (1937)
 Stage Door (1937)
 A Star Is Born (1937)
 Stella Dallas (1937)
 True Confession (1937)
 Varsity Show (1937)
 Wee Willie Winkie (1937)
 The Adventures of Robin Hood (1938)
 Algiers (1938)
 Angels with Dirty Faces (1938)
 A Yank at Oxford (1938)
 Bringing Up Baby (1938)
 Holiday (1938)
 Jezebel (1938)
 The Lady Vanishes (1938)
 Pygmalion (1938)
 You Can't Take It with You (1938)
 5th Avenue Girl (1939)
 Babes in Arms (1939)
 Beau Geste (1939)
 Dark Victory (1939)
 Destry Rides Again (1939)
 Gone with the Wind (1939)
 Goodbye, Mr. Chips (1939)
 Gulliver's Travels (1939)
 Gunga Din (1939)
 Love Affair (1939)
 Midnight (1939)
 Mr. Smith Goes to Washington (1939)
 Ninotchka (1939)
 Only Angels Have Wings (1939)
 Stagecoach (1939)
 The Hunchback of Notre Dame (1939)
 The Little Princess (1939)
 The Oklahoma Kid (1939)
 The Roaring Twenties (1939)
 The Story of Vernon and Irene Castle (1939)
 The Wizard of Oz (1939)
 The Women (1939)
 Wuthering Heights (1939)
 Young Mr. Lincoln (1939)
 All This, and Heaven Too (1940)
 Broadway Melody of 1940 (1940)
 Fantasia (1940)
 Foreign Correspondent (1940)
 The Grapes of Wrath (1940)
 The Great Dictator (1940)
 His Girl Friday (1940)
 Kitty Foyle (1940)
 The Letter (1940)
 The Long Voyage Home (1940)
 The Mortal Storm (1940)
 My Favorite Wife (1940)
 The Philadelphia Story (1940)
 Pinocchio (1940)
 Pride and Prejudice (1940)
 Primrose Path (1940)
 Rebecca (1940)
 The Shop Around the Corner (1940)
 The Thief of Bagdad (1940)
 Waterloo Bridge (1940)
 49th Parallel (1941)
 Ball of Fire (1941)
 Blossoms in the Dust (1941)
 Citizen Kane (1941)
 Dumbo (1941)
 Here Comes Mr. Jordan (1941)
 High Sierra (1941)
 Hold Back the Dawn (1941)
 How Green Was My Valley (1941)
 The Little Foxes (1941)
 The Maltese Falcon (1941)
 Meet John Doe (1941)
 Mr. Bug Goes to Town (1941)
 Mr. and Mrs. Smith (1941)
 One Foot in Heaven (1941)
 Penny Serenade (1941)
 Sergeant York (1941)
 Sullivan's Travels (1941)
 Suspicion (1941)
 The Bride Came C.O.D. (1941)
 The Lady Eve (1941)
 You'll Never Get Rich (1942)
 Tulips Shall Grow (1942)
 All Through the Night (1942)
 Bambi (1942)
 Casablanca (1942)
 Holiday Inn (1942)
 Kings Row (1942)
 The Magnificent Ambersons (1942)
 Now, Voyager (1942)
 The Man Who Came to Dinner (1942)
 Mrs. Miniver (1942)
 The Palm Beach Story (1942)
 The Pied Piper (1942)
 The Pride of the Yankees (1942)
 Random Harvest (1942)
 Saboteur (1942)
 The Talk of the Town (1942)
 Tortilla Flat (1942)
 Wake Island (1942)
 Woman of the Year (1942)
 Yankee Doodle Dandy (1942)
 You Were Never Lovelier (1942)
 For Whom the Bell Tolls (1943)
 Heaven Can Wait (1943)
 The Human Comedy (1943)
 Journey into Fear (1943)
 Madame Curie (1943)
 The More the Merrier (1943)
 The Ox-Bow Incident (1943)
 Shadow of a Doubt (1943)
 The Song of Bernadette (1943)
 Stormy Weather (1943)
 Watch on the Rhine (1943)
 Arsenic and Old Lace (1944)
 Cover Girl (1944)
 Double Indemnity (1944)
 Gaslight (1944)
 Going My Way (1944)
 Henry V (1944)
 Laura (1944)
 Lifeboat (1944)
 The Lodger (1944)
 Meet Me in St. Louis (1944)
 The Miracle of Morgan's Creek (1944)
 National Velvet (1944)
 The Barber of Seville (1944)
 Since You Went Away (1944)
 To Have and Have Not (1944)
 The Uninvited (1944)
 Wilson (1944)
 Anchors Aweigh (1945)
 The Bells of St. Mary's (1945)
 Detour (1945)
 Hangover Square (1945)
 The Lost Weekend (1945)
 Mildred Pierce (1945)
 Spellbound (1945)
 Anna and the King of Siam (1946)
 John Henry and the Inky-Poo (1946)
 The Best Years of Our Lives (1946)
 The Big Sleep (1946)
 Cluny Brown (1946)
 Duel in the Sun (1946)
 Gilda (1946)
 Great Expectations (1946)
 Humoresque (1946)
 It's a Wonderful Life (1946)
 The Killers (1946)
 The Locket (1946)
 Notorious (1946)
 The Postman Always Rings Twice (1946)
 The Razor's Edge (1946)
 The Yearling (1946)
 The Bishop's Wife (1947)
 The Cat Concerto (1947)
 Crossfire (1947)
 Dead Reckoning (1947)
 Gentleman's Agreement (1947)
 The Ghost and Mrs. Muir (1947)
 The Lady from Shanghai (1947)
 Miracle on 34th Street (1947)
 Monsieur Verdoux (1947)
 The Paradine Case (1947)
 Tubby the Tuba (1947)
 Easter Parade (1948)
 Fort Apache (1948)
 Johnny Belinda (1948)
 Key Largo (1948)
 Moonrise (1948)
 Red River (1948)
 Unfaithfully Yours (1948)
 Rope (1948)
 The Snake Pit (1948)
 State of the Union (1948)
 The Treasure of the Sierra Madre (1948)
 Adam's Rib (1949)
 All the King's Men (1949)
 Battleground (1949)
 The Heiress (1949)
 Intruder in the Dust (1949)
 A Letter to Three Wives (1949)
 She Wore a Yellow Ribbon (1949)
 The Third Man (1949)
 Twelve O'Clock High (1949)
 All About Eve (1950)
 Annie Get Your Gun (1950)
 Born Yesterday (1950)
 Caged (1950)
 Cinderella (1950)
 Father of the Bride (1950)
 In a Lonely Place (1950)
 King Solomon's Mines (1950)
 Rio Grande (1950)
 Summer Stock (1950)
 The Furies (1950)
 Sunset Boulevard (1950)
 Treasure Island (1950)
 Ace in the Hole (1951)
 The African Queen (1951)
 Alice in Wonderland (1951)
 An American in Paris (1951)
 The Day the Earth Stood Still (1951)
 Decision Before Dawn (1951)
 A Place in the Sun (1951)
 Quo Vadis (1951)
 Rooty Toot Toot (1951)
 Royal Wedding (1951)
 Strangers on a Train (1951)
 A Streetcar Named Desire (1951)
 The Bad and the Beautiful (1952)
 The Greatest Show on Earth (1952)
 High Noon (1952)
 Ivanhoe (1952)
 Limelight (1952)
 The Miracle of Our Lady of Fatima (1952)
 Monkey Business (1952)
 Moulin Rouge (1952)
 The Prisoner of Zenda (1952)
 The Quiet Man (1952)
 Singin' in the Rain (1952)
 The Story of Robin Hood and His Merrie Men (1952)
  Don't Bother To Knock (1952)
 Calamity Jane (1953)
 The Band Wagon (1953)
 The Big Heat (1953)
 Duck Amuck (1953)
 From Here to Eternity (1953)
 Gentlemen Prefer Blondes (1953)
 How to Marry a Millionaire (1953)
 Julius Caesar (1953)
 Mogambo (1953)
 Peter Pan (1953)
 The Robe (1953)
 Roman Holiday (1953)
 Shane (1953)
 The Sword and the Rose (1953)
 The War of the Worlds (1953)
 20,000 Leagues Under the Sea (1954)
 A Star Is Born (1954)
 The Caine Mutiny (1954)
 The Country Girl (1954)
 Dial M for Murder (1954)
 On the Waterfront (1954)
 Rear Window (1954)
 Rob Roy, the Highland Rogue (1954)
 Sabrina (1954)
 Seven Brides for Seven Brothers (1954)
 Three Coins in the Fountain (1954)
 Vera Cruz (1954)
 When Magoo Flew (1954)
 Blackboard Jungle (1955)
 Kiss Me Deadly (1955)
 Lady and the Tramp (1955)
 Love Is a Many-Splendored Thing (1955)
 Love Me or Leave Me (1955)
 The Man with the Golden Arm (1955)
 Marty (1955)
 Mister Roberts (1955)
 Picnic (1955)
 East of Eden (1955)
 Rebel Without a Cause (1955)
 Guys and Dolls (1955)
 Richard III (1955)
 The Rose Tattoo (1955)
 The Seven Year Itch (1955)
 Around the World in 80 Days (1956)
 Autumn Leaves (1956)
 Forbidden Planet (1956)
 Bigger Than Life (1956)
 Friendly Persuasion (1956)
 Giant (1956)
 Invasion of the Body Snatchers (1956)
 The King and I (1956)
 The Man Who Knew Too Much (1956)
 The Searchers (1956)
 The Swan (1956)
 The Ten Commandments (1956)
 War and Peace (1956)
 12 Angry Men (1957)
 The Bridge on the River Kwai (1957)
 Paths of Glory (1957)
 Sweet Smell of Success (1957)
 A Face in the Crowd (1957)
 Peyton Place (1957)
 Sayonara (1957)
 What's Opera, Doc? (1957)
 Witness for the Prosecution (1957)
 Auntie Mame (1958)
 The Big Country (1958)
 The Brothers Karamazov (1958)
 Cat on a Hot Tin Roof (1958)
 The Defiant Ones (1958)
 Gigi (1958)
 The Long, Hot Summer (1958)
 No Time for Sergeants (1958)
 Separate Tables (1958)
 Touch of Evil (1958)
 Vertigo (1958)
 A Hole in the Head (1959)
 Anatomy of a Murder (1959)
 Ben-Hur (1959)
 Darby O'Gill and the Little People (1959)
 The Diary of Anne Frank (1959)
 Imitation of Life (1959)
 North by Northwest (1959)
 Pillow Talk (1959)
 The Nun's Story (1959)
 Sleeping Beauty (1959)
 Some Like It Hot (1959)
 Suddenly, Last Summer (1959)
 The Last Angry Man (1959)
 The Time Machine (1960)
 The Alamo (1960)
 The Apartment (1960)
 Elmer Gantry (1960)
 Hell to Eternity (1960)
 Home from the Hill (1960)
 The Magnificent Seven (1960)
 Psycho (1960)
 Spartacus (1960)
 The Sundowners (1960)
 Breakfast at Tiffany's (1961)
 The Children's Hour (1961)
 Fanny (1961)
 The Guns of Navarone (1961)
 The Hustler (1961)
 Judgment at Nuremberg (1961)
 One Hundred and One Dalmatians (1961)
 Pocketful of Miracles (1961)
 Splendor in the Grass (1961)
 The Parent Trap (1961)
 West Side Story (1961)
 King of Kings (1961)
 The Misfits (1961)
 Dr. No (1962)
 Gay Purr-ee (1962)
 Hell Is for Heroes (1962)
 How the West Was Won (1962)
 Lawrence of Arabia (1962)
 The Longest Day (1962)
 The Music Man (1962)
 Mutiny on the Bounty (1962)
 Mr. Hobbs Takes a Vacation (1962)
 To Kill a Mockingbird (1962)
 What Ever Happened to Baby Jane? (1962)
 Gypsy (1962)
 America America (1963)
 The Birds (1963)
 Charade (1963)
 Cleopatra (1963)
 The Great Escape (1963)
 From Russia with Love (1963)
 Love with the Proper Stranger (1963)
 Jason and the Argonauts (1963)
 Lilies of the Field (1963)
 The Sword in the Stone (1963)
 Bye Bye Birdie (1963)
 Irma la Douce (1963)
 Move Over, Darling (1963)
 Hud (1963)
 McLintock! (1963)
 A Hard Day's Night (1964)
 Becket (1964)
 Dr. Strangelove (1964)
 Goldfinger (1964)
 Sex and the Single Girl (1964)
 Robin and the 7 Hoods (1964)
 Mary Poppins (1964)
 My Fair Lady (1964)
 Zorba the Greek (1964)
 Send Me No Flowers (1964)
 Viva Las Vegas (1964)
 The Night of the Iguana (1964)
 The Sound of Music (1965)
 Doctor Zhivago (1965)
 Cast a Giant Shadow (1966)
 Guess Who's Coming to Dinner (1967)

Selected international films made during the Golden Age

 The Cabinet of Dr. Caligari (1920, Germany)
 Nosferatu (1922, Germany)
 Häxan (1922, Sweden/Denmark)
 Die Nibelungen (1924, Germany)
 Battleship Potemkin (1925, U.S.S.R.)
 The Adventures of Prince Achmed (1926, Germany)
 Metropolis (1927, Germany)
 Napoléon (1927, France)
 The Passion of Joan of Arc (1928, France)
 Un Chien Andalou (1929, France/Spain)
 Pandora's Box (1929, Germany)
 L'Age d'Or (1930, France)
 Limite (1931, Brazil)
 M (1931, Germany)
 Vampyr (1932, Germany/France)
 Les Misérables (1934, France)
 Two Monks (1934, Mexico)
 L'Atalante (1934, France)
 The 39 Steps (1935, U.K.)
 Let's Go with Pancho Villa (1936, Mexico)
 Grand Illusion (1937, France)
 Terang Boelan (1937, Indonesia)
 The Rules of the Game (1939, France)
 The Story of the Last Chrysanthemums (1939, Japan)
 Forty Thousand Horsemen (1940, Australia)
 You're Missing the Point (1940, Mexico)
 María Candelaria (1943, Mexico)
 Day of Wrath (1943, Denmark)
 Ivan the Terrible (1944–1958, U.S.S.R.)
 Rome, Open City (1945, Italy)
 Brief Encounter (1945, U.K.)
 Children of Paradise (1945, France)
 Paisan (1946, Italy)
 A Matter of Life and Death (1946, U.K.)
 Enamorada (1946, Mexico)
 Shoeshine (1946, Italy)
 The Overlanders (1946, Australia/U.K.)
 Beauty and the Beast (1946, France)
 Neecha Nagar (1946, India)
 The Pearl (1947, Mexico)
 Quai des Orfèvres (1947, France)
 Black Narcissus (1947, U.K.)
 Bicycle Thieves (1948, Italy)
 Hamlet (1948, U.K.)
 Drunken Angel (1948, Japan)
 The Red Shoes (1948, U.K.)
 Spring in a Small Town (1948, China)
 Late Spring (1949, Japan)
 Begone Dull Care (1949, Canada)
 Stray Dog (1949, Japan)
 Kind Hearts and Coronets (1949, U.K.)
 Stromboli (1950, Italy)
 Rashomon (1950, Japan)
 Orpheus (1950, France)
 Los Olvidados (1950, Mexico)
 Genghis Khan (1950, Philippines)
 Víctimas del Pecado (1951, Mexico)
 Miracle in Milan (1951, Italy)
 Umberto D. (1952, Italy)
 Neighbours (1952, Canada)
 Mexican Bus Ride (1952, Mexico)
 Ikiru (1952, Japan)
 Él (1953, Mexico)
 Ugetsu (1953, Japan)
 The Wages of Fear (1953, France)
 Tokyo Story (1953, Japan)
 Sansho the Bailiff (1954, Japan)
 Robinson Crusoe (1954, Mexico)
 Godzilla (1954, Japan)
 Seven Samurai (1954, Japan)
 The Crucified Lovers (1954, Japan)
 Journey to Italy (1954, Italy)
 La Strada (1954, Italy)
 The Criminal Life of Archibaldo de la Cruz (1955, Mexico)
 Ordet (1955, Denmark)
 A Generation (1955, Poland)
 Journey to the Beginning of Time (1955, Czechoslovakia)
 Les Diaboliques (1955, France)
 The Apu Trilogy (1955–1959, India)
 Bob le flambeur (1956, France)
 A Man Escaped (1956, France)
 The Burmese Harp (1956, Japan)
 Floating Clouds (1955, Japan)
 Kanał (1956, Poland)
 Hang Tuah (1956, Malaysia/Singapore)
 Pyaasa (1957, India)
 The Seventh Seal (1957, Sweden)
 Wild Strawberries (1957, Sweden)
 The Cranes Are Flying (1957, U.S.S.R.)
 A King in New York (1957, U.K.)
 Mother India (1957, India)
 The Snow Queen (1957, U.S.S.R.)
 Nights of Cabiria (1957, Italy)
 Cairo Station (1958, Egypt)
 Thunder Among the Leaves (1958, Argentina)
 Mon Oncle (1958, France)
 Jalsaghar (1958, India)
 Ashes and Diamonds (1958, Poland)
 Madhumati (1958, India)
 Invention for Destruction (1958, Czechoslovakia)
 The Day Shall Dawn (1959, Pakistan)
 Hiroshima mon amour (1959, France)
 The 400 Blows (1959, France)
 Black Orpheus (1959, Brazil/France)
 Room at the Top (1959, U.K.)
 Fires on the Plain (1959, Japan)
 Nazarín (1959, Mexico)
 Kaagaz Ke Phool (1959, India)
 Look Back in Anger (1959, U.K.)
 The Soldiers of Pancho Villa (1959, Mexico)
 Ballad of a Soldier (1959, U.S.S.R.)
 Pickpocket (1959, France)
 The Human Condition (1959–1961, Japan)
 Breathless (1960, France)
 Two Women (1960, Italy)
 The Housemaid (1960, South Korea)
 Sons and Lovers (1960, U.K.)
 The Sundowners (1960, Australia/U.K.)
 La Dolce Vita (1960, Italy)
 Obaltan (1960, South Korea)
 L'Avventura (1960, Italy)
 Meghe Dhaka Tara (1960, India)
 Mughal-e-Azam (1960, India)
 La Notte (1961, Italy)
 Viridiana (1961, Mexico/Spain)
 Surogat (1961, Yugoslavia)
 Yojimbo (1961, Japan)
 Very Nice, Very Nice (1961, Canada)
 A Taste of Honey (1961, U.K.)
 Gunga Jumna (1961, India)
 The Exterminating Angel (1962, Mexico)
 L'Eclisse (1962, Italy)
 Ivan's Childhood (1962, U.S.S.R.)
 Jules and Jim (1962, France)
 An Autumn Afternoon (1962, Japan)
 Cléo from 5 to 7 (1962, France)
 Sanjuro (1962, Japan)
 O Pagador de Promessas (1962, Brazil)
 8½ (1963, Italy/France)
 Tom Jones (1963, U.K.)
 This Sporting Life (1963, U.K.)
 Billy Liar (1963, U.K.)
 Mahanagar (1963, India)
 Gamperaliya (1963, Sri Lanka)
 Black God, White Devil (1964, Brazil)
 Gertrud (1964, Denmark)
 Red Desert (1964, Italy)
 Charulata (1964, India)
 A Fistful of Dollars (1964, Italy/West Germany/Spain)
 I Am Cuba (1964, Cuba/U.S.S.R.)
 The Umbrellas of Cherbourg (1964, France/West Germany)
 Dry Summer (1964, Turkey)
 Simon of the Desert (1965, Mexico)
 Pierrot le Fou (1965, France)
 For a Few Dollars More (1965, Italy/West Germany/Spain)
 Loves of a Blonde (1965, Czechoslovakia)
 Subarnarekha (1965, India)
 La muerte de un burócrata (1966, Cuba)
 Persona (1966, Sweden)
 Black Girl (1966, Senegal/France)
 The Battle of Algiers (1966, Algeria/Italy)
 Blow-Up (1966, U.K./Italy)
 A Man for All Seasons (1966, U.K.)
 A Man and a Woman (1966, France)
 Andrei Rublev (1966, U.S.S.R.)
 Au Hasard Balthazar (1966, France)
 Closely Watched Trains (1966, Czechoslovakia)
 War and Peace (1966–1967, U.S.S.R.)
 Three Days and a Child (1967, Israel)
 Le Samouraï (1967, France/Italy)
 Jules Verne's Rocket to the Moon (1967, U.K.)
 Playtime (1967, France/Italy)
 Mouchette (1967, France)
 Belle de Jour (1967, France)
 Entranced Earth (1967, Brazil)
 Once Upon a Time in the West (1968, Italy)
 Romeo and Juliet (1968, U.K./Italy)
 Mandabi (1968, Senegal/France)
 Oliver! (1968, U.K.)
 Memories of Underdevelopment (1968, Cuba)
 Chitty Chitty Bang Bang (1968, U.K.)
 Kes (1969, U.K.)
 Army of Shadows (1969, France)
 The Damned (1969, U.K.)
 Fellini Satyricon (1969, Italy)
 Z (1969, Algeria/France)

See also

 New Hollywood
 First Golden Age of Television
 Golden age of American animation
 Poverty Row – B-movies during this era
 Maximalist and minimalist cinema
 Modernist film

References

Further reading
 
 
 Fawell, John. (2008) The Hidden Art of Hollywood. Westport Conn.: Praeger Press.

External links
 David Bordwell and Kristin Thompson, "Happy Birthday, classical cinema!", December 28, 2007. Analysis of classical continuity in narrative film from 1917 to this day.
 The Movies-Hollywood's Golden Age.com

1910s in film
1913 establishments in the United States
1969 disestablishments in the United States
1920s in film
1930s in film
1940s in film
1950s in film
1960s in film
20th century in American cinema
Cinema of the United States
Film genres particular to the United States
Film styles
History of Hollywood, Los Angeles
Modern art